York County School of Technology (YCST, formerly York County Area Vocational-Technical School) is a public vocational high school in York, Pennsylvania, United States. The school accepts students from 14 sending school districts within York County.

The technical areas, commonly called "shops", are divided into three academies: Arts and Human Services, Engineering and Construction, and Manufacturing and Transportation. The school colors and mascot are identical to those of York College of Pennsylvania.

Programs
York County School of Technology offers the following twenty-five technical programs:

Architecture & Construction Management
Automotive Technology
Carpentry & Construction Technology
Collision Repair 
Commercial & Advertising Art
Communications Technology
Computer Networking 
Computer Programming & Interactive Media
Criminal Justice
Culinary Arts
Dental Assisting 
Diesel Technology
Early Childhood Education 
Electrical Occupations
Electronics/IT Support 
Engineering/Advanced Manufacturing 
Heating, Ventilation & Air Conditioning/Plumbing
Landscaping & Agriculture
Licensed Cosmetology
Medical Professions Program
Network Systems & Cyber Security
PowerSports & Engine Technology 
Precision Machining Technology
Sports Technology & Exercise Science
Welding & Metal Fabrication Technology

Demographics 
York County School of Technology receives students from all of the fourteen school districts in York County. This includes students from private schools and cyber schools.

Renovation 
In 2006 York County School of Technology underwent construction and acquired two additional wings, which are now the "Manufacturing and Transportation" and the "Engineering and Construction" academies. The "Arts and Human Services" academy was remodeled during the school year of 2007.

In 2019 construction began on a new indoor track and athletic facilities. It was to be completed in late 2020 but due to COVID-19 it was delayed and it was finished in 2021. The new addition was named the "Fieldhouse".

References

External links 
 

Public high schools in Pennsylvania
Schools in York County, Pennsylvania
Buildings and structures in York, Pennsylvania